The Danville Tobacco Warehouse and Residential District is a national historic district located at Danville, Virginia. The district includes 532 contributing buildings, 3 contributing sites, and 2 contributing structures in the city of Danville.  The district reflects the late-19th century and early-20th development of Danville as a tobacco processing center and includes residential, commercial, and industrial buildings reflecting that growth. It also includes archaeological sites related to early Native American settlements in the area.  Notable buildings include the American Tobacco's Harris Building, the Imperial Tobacco Company Building, Cabell Warehouse, Patton Storage Units (c. 1940), Crowell Motor Company, Municipal Power Station (1912), Riverside Cotton Mill #1 (1886), and a variety of "shotgun" houses and bungalow workers housing.  Located in the district are the separately listed Danville Municipal Building and Danville Southern Railway Passenger Depot.

It was listed on the National Register of Historic Places in 1982, with a boundary increase in 2009.

See also
National Register of Historic Places listings in Danville, Virginia

References

External links

National Register of Historic Places in Danville, Virginia
Queen Anne architecture in Virginia
Colonial Revival architecture in Virginia
Historic districts on the National Register of Historic Places in Virginia
Buildings and structures in Danville, Virginia
Historic American Engineering Record in Virginia
Tobacco buildings in the United States